The NWA Southern Tag Team Championship was a short-lived professional wrestling tag team title in the National Wrestling Alliance that was defended in Southern Championship Wrestling. It existed from 1981 to 1982.The NWA Southern Tag-Team Titles was brought to Southern Allstar Wrestling where they have been defeated since 2007-to the present day

Title history

References

External links
N.W.A. Southern Tag Team Title (Knoxville)

National Wrestling Alliance championships
Regional professional wrestling championships
Professional wrestling in Tennessee